Goran Kuzmanoski (born 30 November 1982) is a retired Macedonian handball player.

References 

 http://www.eurohandball.com/ech/men/2016/player/515754/GoranKuzmanoski

1981 births
Living people
Macedonian male handball players